Yaron Deutsch (born in 1978) is an Israeli guitarist mainly active in contemporary classical music and artistic director of Ensemble Nikel.

Biography
Yaron Deutsch was born in Tel-Aviv (Israel) in 1978 and studied guitar at the Jerusalem Academy of Music and Dance.

Career
In 2006, he founded the Tel-Aviv based ensemble for contemporary music Nikel. With this ensemble, he gave premieres of pieces by Michael Beil, Franck Bedrossian, Pierluigi Billone, Raphaël Cendo, Chaya Czernowin, Clemens Gadenstätter, Bernard Gander, Philippe Hurel, Eduardo Moguillansky, Marco Momi, Helmut Oehring, Stefan Prins, and Michael Wertmüller.

In 2007, he founded the international contemporary music festival Tzlil Meudcan which takes places every early July in Tel-Aviv. The festival also proposes summer courses for young composers.

He played with numerous ensembles and orchestras under conductors such as Sylvain Camberling, Peter Eötvös, Zubin Mehta, Emilio Pomàrico, Peter Rundel, Ilan Volkov & Bas Wiegers.

Deutsch was appointed professor of contemporary music at the Hochschule für Musik in Basel in 2021.

Selected discography

 33RPM, music by Steve Reich, Marco Mommi, Tristan Murail and Clemens Gadenstätter (September 2020)
 Almost Nowhere, music by Marco Momi (October 2019), Kairos
 Augmented, music by Stefan Prins (March 2019), Kairos
 Om On, music by Pierluigi Billone with Tom Pauwels (September 2018), Kairos
 A Decade with Ensemble Nikel, music by Stefan Prins, Michael Wertmüller and others (July 2017)
 Sgorgo Y . N . oO, music by Pierluigi Billone (October 2016), Kairos
 Fremdkörper, music by Stefan Prins (August 2012), Sub Rosa

Videos
 Stefan Prins - under_current (2021), with Luxembourg Philharmonic Orchestra conducted by Ilan Volkov, live performance at Donaueschinger Musiktage
 Steve Reich - Electric Counterpoint (2020), live performance at Felicja Blumental Music Center
 Stefan Prins - Not I (2018), live recording at Studio Entropya/Perugia
 Andreas Dohmen - a doppio movimento (2017), with SWR Experimentalstudio conducted by Ilan Volkov, live performance at the Donaueschinger Musiktage

References

External links 
 Yaron Deutsch's personal website
 Ensemble Nikel's website

1978 births
Israeli classical musicians
Israeli guitarists
Living people
People from Tel Aviv
20th-century Israeli male musicians
21st-century Israeli male musicians